The 1987 Nutri-Metics Open was a women's tennis tournament played on outdoor hard courts at the ASB Tennis Centre in Auckland in New Zealand and was part of the Category 1 tier of the 1987 Virginia Slims World Championship Series. It was the second edition of the tournament and ran from 26 January until 1 February 1987. Gretchen Magers won the singles title.

Finals

Singles
 Gretchen Magers defeated  Terry Phelps 6–2, 6–3
 It was Magers' 1st singles title of her career.

Doubles
 Anna-Maria Fernandez /  Julie Richardson defeated  Gretchen Magers /  Elizabeth Minter 4–6, 6–4, 6–2

See also
 1987 Benson and Hedges Open – men's tournament

References

External links
 Official website
 ITF tournament edition details
 Tournament draws

Nutri-Metics Open
WTA Auckland Open
1987 in New Zealand tennis
Ten
January 1987 sports events in New Zealand
February 1987 sports events in New Zealand